Mushfig Nazir ogly Rzayev (born 23 March 1998) is an Azerbaijani football player who plays for Azerbaijan Premier League side Sumgayit.

Club career
He made his debut in the Russian Professional Football League for FC Solyaris Moscow on 4 August 2016 in a game against FC Spartak Kostroma.

Career statistics

Club

References

External links
 Profile by Russian Professional Football League

1998 births
Living people
Association football midfielders
Azerbaijani footballers
Azerbaijani expatriate footballers
Expatriate footballers in Russia
FC Solyaris Moscow players
Sumgayit FK players